Adar Elhaik (born 17 March 1997) is an Israeli rhythmic gymnast.

She competed at the 2011 Rhythmic Gymnastics Junior European Championships, winning a bronze medal, and 2013 Rhythmic Gymnastics World Championships.

References 

1997 births
Living people
Israeli rhythmic gymnasts